Miguel Rangel, O.F.M. Cap. (1541 – 16 August 1602) was a Roman Catholic prelate who served as the first Bishop of Angola e Congo (1596–1602).

Biography
Miguel Rangel was born in Coimbra, Portugal and ordained a priest in the Order of Friars Minor Capuchin in 1581.
On 20 May 1596, he was appointed during the papacy of Pope Clement VIII as Bishop of Angola e Congo.
In 1596, he was consecrated bishop by Fabio Blondus de Montealto, Titular Patriarch of Jerusalem. 
He served as Bishop of Angola e Congo until his death on 16 August 1602.

References 

16th-century Roman Catholic bishops in Africa
17th-century Roman Catholic bishops in Africa
Bishops appointed by Pope Clement VIII
1541 births
1602 deaths
People from Coimbra
Capuchin bishops
Roman Catholic bishops of Luanda